The World Federation of Engineering Organizations (French: Federation Mondiale des Organisations d'Ingenieurs; WFEO) is an international, non-governmental organization representing the engineering profession worldwide.

Founded in 1968 by a group of regional engineering organizations, under the auspices of the United Nations Educational, Scientific and Cultural Organizations (UNESCO) in Paris, WFEO is a non governmental international organization that brings together national engineering organizations from over 90 nations and represents some 20 million engineers from around the world.
WFEO is part of the United Nations system as an NGO in official relations with UNESCO (associate status) since its foundation, and as taking part in the work of its main bodies, mainly the United Nations Economic and Social Council (ECOSOC) and its specialized agencies, notably the United Nations Industrial Development Organization, the United Nations Environment Programme. At the UN ECOSOC, WFEO co-organizes with the International Science Council the Scientific and Technological Community Major Group.

In 2019, based on proposal by WFEO, the UNESCO's General Conference approved the creation of the UNESCO World Engineering Day for Sustainable Development, to be celebrated on 4 March of each year. Since then, WFEO has been coordinating the related celebrations around the world, through its membership and partnering institutions.

Structure, membership, activities
The governing body of WFEO is the General Assembly. Between meetings of the General Assembly the affairs of the Federation are directed by the Executive Council. The business of the Federation is dealt with by the Executive Board, supported by the Executive Director. Actions the General Assembly, Executive Council, or Executive Board are by majority vote.
WFEO's membership comprises a hundred member institutions, including national members representing a country, and international members representing either a global region or continent, or representing a branch of the engineering profession at the global scale.

Standing Technical Committees / Policy Implementation Committees
WFEO's main activities in specialized fields of engineering is carried out by its committees, which are hosted by national members for a 4-year term.
 Anti-corruption
 Disaster Risk Management
 Education in Engineering
 Energy
 Information & Communication
 Engineering & the Environment
 Engineering Capacity Building
 Engineering for Innovative Technology
 Water
 Women in Engineering
 Young Engineers / Future Leaders

Conferences
WFEO body meets annually for the General Assembly or Executive Council, and the Committees' meetings. These meetings are framed by a conference, where non affiliated engineers can join. In general these meetings and conferences are held in November.

Presidents

WFEO's President is elected by the General Assembly for a 2-years term, in the context of an immediate past president/president/president-elect system.

International members
 Commonwealth Engineers Council (CEC)
 Federation of Arab Engineers (FAE)
 Federation of African Engineering Organizations (FAEO)
 European Federation of National Engineering Associations (FEANI)
 Federation of Engineering Institutions of South and Central Asia (FEISCA)
 Federation of Engineering Institutions of Asia and the Pacific (FEIAP)
 International Federation of Medical and Biological Engineering (IFMBE)
 International Federation of Municipal Engineers (IFME)
 Pan American Federation of Engineers Society (UPADI)
 Union of Scientific and Engineering Societies (USEA)
 World Council of Civil Engineers (WCCE)

References

External links
 

1968 establishments in France
Engineering societies
International professional associations
International scientific organizations
Organizations established in 1968
Organizations based in Paris
Scientific organizations based in France
World Federation of Engineering Organizations
UNESCO